Pallapalayam is a panchayat town in Erode district in the Indian state of Tamil Nadu.

Demographics
 India census, Pallapalayam had a population of 6,499. Males constitute 51% of the population and females 49%. Pallapalayam has an average literacy rate of 51%, lower than the national average of 59.5%: male literacy is 61%, and female literacy is 41%. In Pallapalayam, 9% of the population is under 6 years of age.

Income sources
The Main income sources of the town are Agriculture and weaving.

The surroundings of the town have many farm lands and the water source being supplied by Lower Bhavani Canal project. The main agricultural products are rice, sugarcane, and turmeric.

The town has many handloom and powerloom weaving centers and hence the half of the income of the town contributes with weaving.

References

Cities and towns in Erode district